Russell School may refer to:

in New Zealand:
Russell School, Bay of Islands
Russell School, Porirua East

in the United Kingdom:
The Russell School (Chorleywood) in Hertfordshire
The Russell School, a former school in Petersham, London
The Russell Primary School, in Petersham, London
Royal Russell School in Croydon

in the United States
Russell School (Flatwoods, Kentucky), Flatwoods, Kentucky 
Russell School (Lexington, Kentucky), listed on the NRHP in Kentucky
Russell School (Kalispell, Montana), listed on the NRHP in Montana
Russell School (Missoula, Montana)
Russell School (Durham, North Carolina), an NRHP-listed Rosenwald school

See also
Russell High School (disambiguation)